Zanburak (also Romanized as Zanbūrak) is a village in the Central District of Qom County, Qom Province, Iran. At the 2006 census, its population was 315, in 74 families.

References 

Populated places in Qom Province